Raúl Mazerati (born 17 October 1957) is an Argentine rowing coxswain. He competed in two events at the 1972 Summer Olympics.

References

1957 births
Living people
Argentine male rowers
Olympic rowers of Argentina
Rowers at the 1972 Summer Olympics
Place of birth missing (living people)
Coxswains (rowing)
Pan American Games medalists in rowing
Pan American Games gold medalists for Argentina
Rowers at the 1971 Pan American Games